The Vanderbilt IMG Sports Network, also known as the Commodore Radio Network, is the sports radio network for the Vanderbilt Commodores, the athletic programs of Vanderbilt University. Headquartered in Nashville, Tennessee, the network consists of 10 radio stations in Middle Tennessee, and one in Kentucky.

There is no television division of this network, but Vanderbilt Commodores fans worldwide can listen to coaches shows and game events on Vanderbilt Access at the athletic department's website. IMG College has been operating the Vanderbilt Sports network since 2000.

Since 2012, WLAC, known on air as "NewsRadio 1510," is the Nashville area home (and flagship station) of Vanderbilt sports programming. Because that station is a 50,000 clear-channel AM station, Vanderbilt's night-time games can be heard in most of the eastern United States and parts of southeastern Canada. WSM, the other clear-channel station in Nashville, previously served as the network's flagship from the 1950s through 2012. WLAC took over as flagship station two years after losing rival Vol Network's broadcasts of Tennessee Volunteers basketball and football games to WGFX-FM.

Radio affiliates

Current affiliates

Tennessee

Kentucky

Former affiliates
Ashland City, TN -- WQSV AM 790 
Benton, Kentucky -- WCBL-FM 
Chattanooga, TN -- WDOD (defunct)
Clarksville, TN -- WJZM AM 1400 
Gallatin, TN (Nashville) -- WGFX FM 104.5 
Nashville -- WSM AM 650 (195?-2012) 
West Memphis, Arkansas (Memphis, TN) -- KWAM 
Winchester, TN -- WCDT

References

External links
Vanderbilt Commodores - Official Site
 

 

College football on the radio
College basketball on the radio in the United States
Vanderbilt Commodores
Vanderbilt University
Sports radio networks in the United States